Kenedy Vidic Onyango Ouma is a Kenyan defender who features for Kenyan Premier League side Nairobi City Stars. He formerly turned out for Sony Sugar F.C., Shabana F.C., F.C. Talanta, Nairobi Stima F.C., Nakumatt FC, Posta Rangers F.C., and Kakamega Homeboyz F.C.

Career
Kenedy started his club journey with Sony Sugar U19 side in 2011. He was later loaned out to lower-tier side Shabana F.C. and then moved to the Kenyan City to join Nairobi Stima F.C.

He moved to the Kenyan topflight in 2013 after joining the now-defunct Karuturi Sports for the first leg before moving to second-tier side F.C. Talanta for the second leg. After a full season at the club, he moved to another second-tier side Nakumatt FC till 2017.

He then joined Posta Rangers FC
 at the start of the 2018 season. Prior to that move, he had been rumored to be on his way to multiple league champions Gor Mahia F.C.

After, he returned West-ward, to Kakamega Homeboyz, and went on to complete 2018/19 and 2019/2020
 seasons before returning to Nairobi to join freshly promoted Nairobi City Stars on an initial two-year contract before extending it further for the 2022/23 season. He scored his maiden goal for the club in October 2021 against Wazito F.C.

References

External links
 Kenedy Onyango at Football Critic
 Kenedy Ouma at GAS

1988 births
Living people
Kenyan footballers
Nairobi City Stars players
Kakamega Homeboyz F.C. players
Posta Rangers F.C. players
Mt Kenya United F.C. players
Kenyan Premier League players